Helleland is a former municipality in Rogaland county, Norway.  The  municipality existed from 1838 until its dissolution in 1965.  The municipality is now located in the central part of the present-day municipality of Eigersund.  The administrative centre of the municipality was the village of Helleland where the Helleland Church is located.

History
The parish of Helleland was established as a municipality on 1 January 1838 (see formannskapsdistrikt law). During the 1960s there were many municipal mergers across Norway due to the work of the Schei Committee.  On 1 January 1965, the municipality of Helleland (population: 851) was merged with the town of Egersund (population: 3,787), the municipality of Eigersund (population: 4,664), and the Gyadalen and Grøsfjell areas of the municipality of Heskestad (population: 114).  The merger created a much larger municipality of Eigersund.

Government
All municipalities in Norway, including Helleland, are responsible for primary education (through 10th grade), outpatient health services, senior citizen services, unemployment and other social services, zoning, economic development, and municipal roads.  The municipality is governed by a municipal council of elected representatives, which in turn elects a mayor.

Municipal council
The municipal council  of Helleland was made up of 13 representatives that were elected to four year terms.  The party breakdown of the final municipal council was as follows:

See also
List of former municipalities of Norway

References

Eigersund
Former municipalities of Norway
1838 establishments in Norway
1965 disestablishments in Norway